Avtomobilist Leningrad may refer to:

 VC Avtomobilist Saint Petersburg
 FC Spartak Leningrad